Michael Chandler is a mixed martial artist

Michael Chandler may also refer to:

Michael Chandler (priest) (born 1945), Anglican dean of Ely
Michael A. Chandler, American film editor, writer and director
Mike Chandler (born 1958), racing driver
Michael Chandler (bodyguard) (born 1985), International Security Consultant